Etude House is a South Korean cosmetics brand owned by Amore Pacific. The brand name 'Étude' means 'study' in French. As of 2018, there were 393 Etude House stores, and in 2019, only 285 Etude House stores.

History 
The company was established in 1966 and the corporate name was changed to Oscar Corporation in 1985. In 1990, it was incorporated by Amore Pacific Group. The name was changed to Etude Corporation in 1997.

Etude House Seoul was launched in 2005. It opened its 100th brand store in 2007 and its 200th in 2009.

In 2009, Etude House launched stores in Taiwan, Singapore and the Philippines. It also launched stores in Brunei and Myanmar in 2010. It opened its 100th overseas branch in the same year.

Etude House opened its first branch in Shinjuku, Japan, in November 2011.

During March 2018, certain products were recalled by the  Ministry of Food and Drug Safety for containing high amounts of antimony, shortly before Etude House opened its first branch in the Middle East in Dubai and a second branch in Kuwait.

Spokespersons and models
Etude House was endorsed by Jun Ji-hyun from 1999 to 2000. S.E.S replaced her and endorsed the brand from 2000 to 2001. Song Hye-kyo became a model of Etude House in 2001 and endorsed the brand until 2006. Jang Keun-suk and Go Ara were models of the brand from 2006 to 2008. Lee Min-ho, Park Shin-hye, Yoo Seung-ho was a model of the brand from 2009 to 2010. 2NE1 was the first YG Entertainment artists that Etude worked with from 2010 to 2011. Sandara Park became a model from 2011 to 2012.

In October 2011, Etude House officially announced their first male endorser SHINee stating that “SHINee has received great love not only in Asia but also in Europe. It makes SHINee the leader in the Hallyu Wave. As the idols who have grown into men, they are very appropriate to be appointed as models of Etude House.”

Krystal Jung and Sulli became a model of Etude House in 2013 to 2014 and endorsed the brand until 2018. I.O.I were models in 2017. In 2018, the members of Red Velvet became Etude House models. As of 2019, Kim Doah from Fanatics is the model for Etude House. In 2022, Kazuha the member of Le Sserafim became Etude House new muse.

Marketing 
Etude's brand concept is to allow the customer to freely and proudly unleash their inner princess. In connection with this concept, Etudeau is conducting Princess Marketing, to make customers feel like they have become princesses. For example, Etude House staff once said "hello, princess" when customers enter the store and "be happy, princess" when they leave the store. Another example is the interior of Etude House, which has a romantic and pretty princess-style interior with a pink theme. Employees at the store are also dressed in pink princess helper costumes, making customers feel like princesses.

Famous 
The company's "Double Lasting Foundation" promoted 24-hour retention, high coverage, and excellent adhesion during marketing. As a result, and combined with word of mouth by consumers, sales surpassed 1.2 million as of 2019.

Controversy 
Following the Namyang Dairy Incident, the 'Tyranny of the Cosmetic Industry', which was uncovered in June 2013, revealed that Etude House, along with Amore Pacific, Tony Moly, and The Face Shop, had been viciously domineering to the agency owners. The unfair trade practices of the cosmetic affiliate headquarters were found to violate the law, such as compulsory purchase (so-called pushing out quantity, skipping quantity), forced sales target, forced provision of economic benefits, unfair contract renewal refusal, unfair contract termination, sales support refusal, and business area infringement.

References

External links
 Official website

Amorepacific brands
Companies based in Seoul
Chemical companies established in 1966